In Greek mythology, Bathycleia was the mother of Hallirrhothius by Poseidon. After her son raped Alcippe, the maiden's father Ares, in revenge, killed Halirrhothius. Bathycleia may be the same as the nymph Euryte, another name for the mother of Halirrhothius.

Notes

References 
Apollodorus, The Library with an English Translation by Sir James George Frazer, F.B.A., F.R.S. in 2 Volumes, Cambridge, MA, Harvard University Press; London, William Heinemann Ltd. 1921. Online version at the Perseus Digital Library. Greek text available from the same website.

Women in Greek mythology
Characters in Greek mythology